Carlarius heudelotii, the smoothmouth sea catfish, is a species of sea catfish.

Location
It occurs along the western coast of Africa from Mauritania to Gabon or Angola.  While mostly a marine species occurring on the continental shelf, it has also been reported from the Niger basin and the Benoué and Gambia Rivers.

Biology
The smoothmouth sea catfish stays buried in the mud and feeds on invertebrates and occasionally leaves the bottom to feed on open prey. These fish have rays on their fins which are known to be very venomous and painful if a wound is inflicted. The female in this species bear large eggs.

Size
The maximum published weight of the smoothmouth sea catfish is 8,500 g.

References
 

Ariidae
Fish of the Atlantic Ocean
Fish of Africa
Fish described in 1840